The British and Foreign Bible Society, often known in England and Wales as simply the Bible Society, is a non-denominational Christian Bible society with charity status whose purpose is to make the Bible available throughout the world.

The Society was formed on 7 March 1804 by a group of people including William Wilberforce and Thomas Charles to encourage the "wider circulation and use" of the Scriptures.

History 

The British and Foreign Bible Society dates back to 1804 when a group of Christians, associated with the Religious Tract Society, sought to address the problem of a lack of affordable Bibles in Welsh for Welsh-speaking Christians. Many young girls had walked long distances to Thomas Charles to get copies of the Bible. Later the story was told of one of them – a young girl called Mary Jones who walked over 20 miles to get a Bible in Bala, Gwynedd.

BFBS was not the first Bible Society in the world.  The first organisation in Britain to be called "The Bible Society" was founded in 1779: it still exists and is called the Naval & Military Bible Society.

The first BFBS translation project was the Gospel of John into Mohawk for Canada in 1804.  In the British Isles BFBS reprinted Bibles in Welsh, Scots Gaelic and Manx Gaelic first produced by SPCK.  The first Romani translation was the Gospel of Luke into the Caló language of Iberia.

A report in the 13 November 1824 edition of the Buffalo Emporium and General Advertiser (NY), stated that the BFBS "since its establishment, has distributed 1,723,251 Bibles, and 2,529,114 Testamentsmaking a total of 4,252,365."

From the early days, the Society sought to be ecumenical and non-sectarian. The Controversy in 1825–26 about the Apocrypha and the Metrical Psalms resulted in the secession of the Glasgow and Edinburgh Bible Societies, which later formed what is now the Scottish Bible Society. This and another similar 1831 controversy about Unitarians holding significant Society offices resulted in a minority separating to form the Trinitarian Bible Society.

The Bible Society extended its work to England, India, Europe and beyond. Protestant communities in many European countries (such as Croatia and Albania) date back to the work of nineteenth-century BFBS Bible salesmen. Auxiliary branches were set up all over the world, which later became Bible Societies in their own right, and today operate in co-operation as part of the United Bible Societies. The Bible Society is a non-denominational Christian network which works to translate, revise, print, and distribute affordable Bibles in England and Wales.

A newspaper article in the 15 March 1879 edition of The Gazette (Montreal), noted that the total circulation by the BFBS "has been 82,000,000...during the last seventy-five years" (since 1804). By 1909 it had issued 215,000,000 copies of the Bible.

During World War One Bible Society distributed more than nine million copies of Scripture, in over 80 languages, to combatants and prisoners of war on all sides of the war. Bible Society managed this despite immense challenges – supply shortages, rising paper costs, paper rationing, submarine blockades and the sinking of merchant shipping.

Even greater than these physical difficulties was the emotional toll – former colleagues suddenly found themselves fighting on opposing sides. Bible salesmen throughout Europe were conscripted or volunteered into their respective armies. The Bible Society responded to the challenge. They printed New Testaments bound in khaki, stamped with a cross, for distribution via the Red Cross among sick and wounded soldiers, sailors and prisoners of war.

On average between 6–7,000 volumes were sent out every working day for fighting men, the sick and wounded, the prisoners of war, exiles and refugees. That's over four copies distributed each minute, day and night, for the duration of the war.

Translation work never stopped – between August 1914 and November 1918, Bible Society printed Scriptures in 34 new languages and dialects. This meant on average there was one new version every seven weeks during the whole period of war.

For many years the headquarters of the society was in London; in 1972 its address was 146, Queen Victoria Street, E.C.4. By 1972 it had published or distributed whole Bibles or parts of the Bible in 1,431 languages. At that time it was distributing 173 million copies each year.

The Society today 
The Society is working to circulate the Scriptures across the world, in the church and through the culture.

The strategy of Bible Society centres on Bible availability, accessibility and credibility - what it calls the ‘lifecycle’ of the Bible. These strategic approaches encompass all of its activity: translation, production, distribution, literacy, engagement and advocacy.

Translation: making the Bible available in languages without the Scriptures, and revising existing Bibles to bring the language up-to-date, so that everyone can experience the Scriptures in their mother tongue.  Translation is into spoken and signed languages
Production: printing physical copies of the Bible and producing Scriptures in different formats such as print, audio, and digital forms in order to meet the demands of the millions around the world who want a Bible of their own
Distribution: taking the Bible to places where it might otherwise be hard to come by, in formats that people can use
Literacy: helping people to read and to read well, using the Bible as a resource
Engagement: helping people grapple with the Bible, read and respond to it wisely
Advocacy: giving the wider culture a reason and opportunity to encounter the joys of the Bible

The Bible Society has by far the largest collection of Bibles in the world, with about 39,000 items. It includes its Chinese Collection which is the largest collection of Chinese Scriptures anywhere in the world. Since the society's move to Swindon in 1985 the library has been located in the library of the University of Cambridge.

Where the Society works 

The Society's mission is global. Its work is organised into two categories: domestic and international.

The Society is part of an international fellowship of over 140 Bible Societies around the world, known as the United Bible Societies. Its entire international programme is delivered on the ground through the close relationship they have with each of their fellow Bible Societies.

See also 
 American Bible Society
 Protestant missionary societies in China during the 19th Century
 Christian apologetics
 Ernest Tipson
 George Borrow
 1823 Peshitta edition
 Kulish's Bible

References

Further reading
T. H. Darlow & Horace Frederick Moule, Historical Catalogue of the Printed Editions of Holy Scripture in the Library of the British and Foreign Bible Society. 2 vols. in 3. London: Bible House, 1903-1911 (commonly cited as Darlow & Moule).
--do.--[reissued:]  New York: Kraus Reprint Co., 1963. 
Herbert, A. S. Historical Catalogue of Printed Editions of the English Bible 1525–1961. London: British and Foreign Bible Society; New York: American Bible Society, 1968. .

External links 
 
 
 Bible Society work in England and Wales
 Old Bible Maps Published by the Bible Society (Courtesy of Hipkiss' Scanned Old Maps)
 
Bible Society's library; Cambridge University Library

Bible societies
Christian charities based in the United Kingdom
Religious organizations established in 1804
Christian organizations established in the 19th century
1804 establishments in the United Kingdom